Liverpool 8 is the 15th studio album by Ringo Starr, released worldwide on 14 January 2008. Received with mixed reviews, it marked Starr's return to EMI for the first time since leaving the label in 1975, following the end of the Beatles' recording contract with the company.

Background
Liverpool 8 was originally planned for release in June 2007, and began as another production by the collaborative team of Mark Hudson and Starr (the two had previously co-produced Vertical Man, I Wanna Be Santa Claus, VH1 Storytellers, Ringo Rama, and Choose Love). However, the release date was pushed back to the beginning of 2008 when Hudson was replaced by Dave Stewart after a falling out with Starr. The album's production credits read, "Produced by Ringo Starr and Mark Hudson; Re-Produced by Ringo Starr and David Stewart."

All of the songs but one were written with the Roundheads, although Stewart also has several co-writing credits. Starr's attorney Bruce Grakal told journalist Peter Palmiere that the partnership between Hudson and Starr was over and they would never work together again. This happened after Hudson dropped out of Starr's 2006 tour as musical director to do the television special The One: Making a Music Star. According to Palmiere, Hudson claimed that the split was over Starr's insistence on using synthesized sounds, for which Stewart is known, whereas Hudson wanted real guitars, pianos, strings etc. However, concerning the parting of ways with Hudson, Starr commented, "The separation between Mark Hudson and myself was a question of trust and friendship and had nothing to do with synthesizers."

Release
Liverpool 8 was released worldwide by Capitol Records. The title refers to the postal district of the Toxteth area of Liverpool in which Starr was born. The album was released on CD, MP3, and USB Wristband. It was available as a free audio stream at www.vh1classic.com before its release date. The title track was released on CD and digital download as the first single from the album on 7 January 2008. Liverpool 8 entered the UK Album Chart at number 91, and reached a peak of number 94 in the US. The album sold 7,000 copies within the first week of release and as of January 2010, 31,000 copies have been sold.

A few weeks later after the album release, readers of the New York Daily News were offered a non-album track called "It's Love", which was recorded during the sessions for Liverpool 8.

Reception

Liverpool 8 has a 59 percent "mixed or average" rating from Metacritic. Billboard gave the album a positive review, calling it "full of nostalgia for the good ol' days". Stephen Thomas Erlewine of AllMusic writes that "it's nothing too flashy and it has not one tune that calls attention to itself". In a particularly unfavourable review for The Times, Pete Paphides wrote that "it’s hard not to boggle at Liverpool's susceptibility to flattery", and "Just because [the album] was fun to make, it doesn’t follow that you might enjoy listening to it."

Track listing
All tracks written by Ringo Starr, Mark Hudson, Gary Burr and Steve Dudas except where noted.

USB file listing
The Ringo Starr Liverpool 8 Exclusive Reusable USB Wristband claims to contain on its packaging:
 Entire album in MP3 format
 Personal message from Ringo Starr
 Behind the scenes interview video from Ringo Starr
 Track-by-track video commentary by Ringo Starr
 2 brand new ringtones
 Photos and Bio
The Bio could not be located among the USB files.
These are the actual files found on the USB drive.

Root Directory 
The root directory contains two system files, one system directory (empty), and four directories with the actual assets.  Note, the original directory dates were lost when the USB was inserted into a Windows 10 PC.

Liverpool 8 - 192kbps Directory 
This directory contains the twelve songs on the album in MP3 format.  Technical details of the files are:
 Encoded by iTunes v7.1.1.5
 Codec: MPEG Audio layer 1/2 (mpga)
 Type: Audio
 Channels: Stereo
 Sample rate: 44100 Hz
 Bits per sample: 32
 Bitrate: 192 kbit/s

Liverpool 8 Artwork Directory 
The artwork is found on a single PDF file with two pages showing the album's cover art on the first page and a track listing next to Ringo's picture on the second page.

Liverpool 8 Video Directory 
The single video file contains three of the items promised on the packaging:
 Personal message from Ringo Starr
 Behind the scenes interview video from Ringo Starr
 Track-by-track video commentary by Ringo Starr
The technical details of the video file are:
 Audio
 Codec: MPEG AAC Audio (mp4a)
 Channels: Stereo
 Sample rate: 32000 Hz
 Bits per sample: 32
 Video
 Codec: H264 - MPEG-4 AVC (part 10) (avc1)
 Video resolution: 480x270
 Frame rate: 29.966428 (NTSC)

Ringtune Clips - 192kbps Directory 
The two ringtones are encoded identical to the twelve songs.  They are 38 and 27 second edits of two of the album's songs.

Personnel
Personnel per booklet.

Musicians
 Ringo Starr – drums, vocals, percussion, backing vocals, claps, organ
 Sean Hurley – bass
 David A. Stewart – electric guitar, acoustic guitar, orchestra arrangement, backwards fabulousness, slide Guitar
 Gary Burr – backing vocals, claps, electric guitar, acoustic guitar, whistle, keyboards, mandolin
 Steve Dudas – backing vocals, claps, electric guitar, classical guitar
 Brent Carpenter – backing vocals, claps
 Mark Hudson – backing vocals, claps, bass, electric guitar, piano, keyboards, acoustic guitar, bongos, harmonica, mellotron
 Bruce Sugar – backing vocals, claps
 Keith Allison – backing vocals, claps
 Suzie Katayama – orchestra arrangement, conductor
 Zac Rae – keyboards
 Dave Way – bass
 Jesse Davey – electric guitar

Production
 Ringo Starr, Mark Hudson – producers, except on "Liverpool 8"
 Ringo Starr, David A. Stewart – producers on "Liverpool 8"
 Mark Hudson – additional production
 Ringo Starr, David A. Stewart – re-producers
 Bruce Sugar – engineer
 Steve Dudas, Gary Burr, Ned Douglas – additional engineers
 Bill Malina – mixing
 Ted Jensen – mastering
 Tom Recchion – art direction
 Paul Moore – design
 Brian Griffin – photography

Charts

References

External links

 The Official Ringo Starr Site

2008 albums
Ringo Starr albums
Albums produced by David A. Stewart
Albums produced by Ringo Starr
Albums produced by Mark Hudson (musician)
Capitol Records albums